{{DISPLAYTITLE:C16H14O4}}
The molecular formula C16H14O4 (molar mss : 270.28 g/mol, exact mass : 270.089209 u) may refer to:

 Alpinetin, a flavanone
 Cardamomin, a chalcone
 Imperatorin, a coumarin
 Medicarpin, a flavonoid
 Nudol, a phenanthrenoid

Molecular formulas